Marcel Zapytowski (born 8 January 2001) is a Polish professional footballer who plays as a goalkeeper for Ekstraklasa club Korona Kielce.

Career

Club career
On 3 January 2020, Zapytowski officially joined II liga club Resovia.

References

External links

Polish footballers
Association football goalkeepers
2001 births
Living people
Wisła Płock players
Resovia (football) players
Korona Kielce players
Ekstraklasa players
I liga players
II liga players
III liga players